Renea is a genus of air-breathing land snails with an operculum, terrestrial gastropod mollusks in the family Aciculidae.

Species
Species within the genus Renea include:
 Renea berica Niero, Nardi & Braccia, 2012
 Renea bourguignatiana G. Nevill, 1880 - type species
 Renea caucasica 
 Renea elegantissima (Pini, 1886)
 Renea gentilei (Pollonera, 1889)
 Renea gormonti Boeters, E. Gittenberger & Subai, 1989
 Renea kobelti (A. J. Wagner, 1910)
 † Renea leobersdorfensis (Wenz, 1921) 
 † Renea microceras (A. Braun in Walchner, 1851) 
 Renea moutoni (Dupuy, 1849)

 Renea paillona Boeters, E. Gittenberger & Subai, 1989
 † Renea pretiosa (Andreae, 1904) 
 † Renea saccoi Ciangherotti & Esu, 2005 
 Renea spectabilis (Rossmässler, 1839)
 Renea veneta (Pirona, 1865)
Synonyms
 Renea douctouyrensis Bertrand, 2004: synonym of Acicula douctouyrensis (Bertrand, 2004) (original combination)
Renea singularis (Pollonera, 1905): synonym of Renea moutonii singularis (Pollonera, 1905)

References

 
Aciculidae
Gastropod genera
Taxonomy articles created by Polbot